INS Baaz is an Indian naval air station under the joint-services Andaman and Nicobar Command (ANC) of the Indian Armed Forces. It is located near Campbell Bay, on Great Nicobar island in the Andaman & Nicobar Islands. It is the southernmost air station of the Indian Armed Forces. It overlooks the Strait of Malacca as well as the Six Degree channel between Great Nicobar and the Indonesian island of Sumatra.

History 
INS Baaz was commissioned by the Chief of the Naval Staff, Admiral Nirmal Kumar Verma on 31 July 2012. It is the first air station in the Nicobar Islands, situated on the Great Nicobar island in the remotest and southernmost part of the Andaman and Nicobar Islands and lies very close to the Six Degree channel, a vital choke point. The commissioning of the air station will facilitate positioning of maritime reconnaissance aircraft and helicopters of ANC and also facilitate the Civil Administration to operate regular intra-island sorties. The Naval air station will provide requisite logistic, communication and administrative support for various aircraft undertaking surveillance, patrolling missions and maritime air operations. The strategically located INS Baaz will enable India to extend its reach in the eastern Indian Ocean region.

Commander SK Singh Deo is the first commanding officer of INS Baaz. INS Baaz will initially be used as a base for the Indian Navy's Dornier 228 reconnaissance aircraft. It can also operate the Indian Air Force's C-130J Super Hercules transport aircraft. Its runway measures  and will be progressively lengthened to enable all heavy aircraft to operate from the base.

Modernization 
There are plans to extend the runway to 6,000 feet by 2016 and then to 10,000 feet. The Indian Navy has been flying new Boeing P8i Poseidon surveillance aircraft with anti-submarine capabilities from Mainland India to Port Blair but once the runway is at 6,000 feet they would also rotate through Campbell Bay from time to time.

Airlines and destinations

 Indian navy 
 List of Indian Navy bases
 List of active Indian Navy ships

 Integrated commands and units
 Armed Forces Special Operations Division
 Defence Cyber Agency
 Integrated Defence Staff
 Integrated Space Cell
 Indian Nuclear Command Authority
 Indian Armed Forces
 Special Forces of India

 Other lists
 Strategic Forces Command
 List of Indian Air Force stations
 List of Indian Navy bases
 India's overseas military bases

References

Baaz
Buildings and structures in the Andaman and Nicobar Islands
Airports in the Andaman and Nicobar Islands